Khau Fo is a village in Myanmar. On January 13, 2010, 'Sangbik', the former chairman of Thanlang Block Peace and Development Council (BPDC) was killed by five men at 7:15 pm, in Khua Fo.

References 

Villages in Myanmar